Wim Dielissen (17 June 1926 – 7 January 2002) was a Dutch racing cyclist. He rode in the 1951 Tour de France.

References

1926 births
2002 deaths
Dutch male cyclists
Place of birth missing